Brede Mathias Moe (born 15 December 1991) is a Norwegian professional footballer who plays as a defender for Bodø/Glimt.

Career statistics

Club

Honours
Bodø/Glimt
Eliteserien: 2020, 2021

References

1991 births
Living people
People from Flatanger
Norwegian footballers
Association football defenders
Eliteserien players
Norwegian First Division players
Ranheim Fotball players
FK Bodø/Glimt players
Rosenborg BK players
Sportspeople from Trøndelag